LeVante Bellamy (born November 28, 1996) is an American football running back who is a free agent. He played college football at Western Michigan.

College career
Bellamy was a member of the Western Michigan Broncos from 2015 to 2019. Bellamy rushed for 1,228 yards and six touchdowns on 205 carries and was named first-team All-Mid-American Conference (MAC) in his junior season. As a senior, he was named the MAC Offensive Player of the Year and first-team all-conference after rushing for 1,472 yards and 23 touchdowns. Bellamy finished his collegiate career with 617 carries for 3,720 yards and 35 touchdowns with 57 receptions for 370 yards and one touchdown.

Professional career
Bellamy was signed by the Denver Broncos as an undrafted free agent on April 25, 2020. He was waived during final roster cuts on September 5, 2020, but was signed to the team's practice squad the next day. He was elevated on September 19 for the team's week 2 game against the Pittsburgh Steelers, and reverted to the practice squad after the game. He was elevated again on September 26 for the team's week 3 game against the Tampa Bay Buccaneers, and reverted to the practice squad after the game. He was promoted to the active roster on September 30. He was placed on injured reserve on October 10. He was activated on November 24, and waived the next day. He was re-signed to the team's practice squad on November 27. On December 26, 2020, Bellamy was promoted back to the active roster.

On August 17, 2021, Bellamy was waived/injured by the Broncos and placed on injured reserve. He was released on December 7.

References

External links
Western Michigan Broncos bio
Denver Broncos bio

1996 births
Living people
American football running backs
Western Michigan Broncos football players
Denver Broncos players
Players of American football from Indianapolis